Phyllosticta carpogena is a fungal plant pathogen infecting caneberries.

References

External links
 USDA ARS Fungal Database

Fungal plant pathogens and diseases
Small fruit diseases
carpogena